Mamadou Lamine Loum (born February 3, 1952) is a Senegalese political figure. Considered a technocrat, he served as Prime Minister of Senegal from 3 July 1998 to 5 April 2000.

Loum was born in Mboss. He graduated from the Faculty of Law of the University Cheikh Anta Diop (UCAD) and the Ecole Nationale d'Administration (ENA). After completing his education at Senegal's National School of Administration and Magistracy, he became an inspector at the Treasury in 1977 and then Treasurer-General of Senegal in 1984. He was Director-General of the Treasury from 1991 to 1993, then Minister-Delegate for the Budget, working under the Minister of Finance, from June 1993 to January 1998. Considered "a rigorous economist," he successfully negotiated debt rescheduling with the Club of Paris.  He was named Minister of Finance and Economy in January 1998, serving in that position for six months until being appointed Prime Minister.

References

1952 births
Living people
Prime Ministers of Senegal
Socialist Party of Senegal politicians
Finance ministers of Senegal